Yesenia may refer to:

Film and television 
Yesenia (film), a 1971 Mexican film starring Jacqueline Andere and Jorge Lavat
Yesenia (1970 TV series), a Mexican telenovela produced by Valentín Pimstein for Telesistema Mexicano
Yesenia (1987 TV series), a Mexican telenovela produced by Irene Sabido for Televisa

People 
Yesenia Aldama (born 1989), Cuban handball goalkeeper
Yesenia "Jessie" Camacho, American reality show contestant
Yesenia Centeno (born 1971), Spanish marathon runner
Yesenia Ferrera (born 1998), Cuban artistic gymnast
Yesenia López (born 1990), Chilean footballer
Yesenia Miranda (born 1994), Salvadoran racewalker
Yesenia Montilla, Dominican-American poet
Yesenia Nolasco Ramírez (born 1982), Mexican politician
Yesenia Valencia (born 1991), Guatemalan recurve archer